Ali Samereh (born November 23, 1977) is an Iranian football coach and former player. He played for Iranian clubs Fajr Sepasi, Esteghlal and Mes Kerman, for Italian side Perugia, and for UAE clubs Al-Shaab and Ajman. He usually played as a striker.

Club career
Samereh began his career at Iranian Premier League outfit F.C. Fajr Sepasi and soon showed what he is capable of, this earned him a move to the Iranian giants Esteghlal F.C. He continued his first-rate performance with Esteghlal F.C. and was instrumental in the glory of the club. They took the opportunity and sent him on loan to Perugia Calcio, a Serie A Italian club for a fee of £166,000. Samereh's success with Perugia Calcio was very limited due to only two handfuls of appearances with the club and he soon returned to Esteghlal FC.

In 2005, he moved to the UAE to play for Al-Shaab. During the first season, Ali Samereh scored 17 goals for the club in the UAE League, becoming the league's third top goalscorer in the 2005/06 season. He continued his impressive performances for his club, scoring another 17 goals in the 2006/07 league season and becoming the second top scorer.

Samereh, UAE League's top goal scorer extended his contract at Al-Shaab for another year in a $700,000 contract.

He moved back to Iran in May 2009 and sign one-year contract with Mes Kerman, He scored important goals for Mes at 2010 AFC Champions League.

Career statistics

International career
He was called up for the national team in 2002, and made several appearances, however he could not repeat his goal scoring feat at the national level. After a period away from football due to injury, Samereh soon bounced back and continued his scoring for Esteghlal F.C. in the 2003/04 season and was recalled to the Iran national football team.

He was a couple of years away from Team Melli despite his goalscoring record in the UAE League. In January 2007 he was once again called up to the national team for a friendly tournament in the UAE, where he has been playing for Al-Shaab since 2005, though he did not join the squad.

In January 2008 he once again joined the Iranian squad for the 2010 FIFA World Cup qualification campaign, appearing for Iran in a warm-up friendly match against Qatar. With Vahid Hashemian not participating in the third stage of the qualification, Samereh was expected to play an important role in this campaign.

Afhsin Ghotbi recalled the striker for the FIFA World Cup qualifying campaign against South Korea.

Managerial career
Samereh was manager of Mes Rafsanjan until his dismissal in September 2018.

References

External links
 Channel 4 Article : Perugia Net Iranian Inzaghi

1977 births
Living people
People from Rafsanjan
Iranian footballers
Association football forwards
Iran international footballers
Fajr Sepasi players
Esteghlal F.C. players
A.C. Perugia Calcio players
Al-Shaab CSC players
Ajman Club players
Sanat Mes Kerman F.C. players
Pas players
Mes Sarcheshme players
Mes Rafsanjan players
Azadegan League players
Serie A players
Persian Gulf Pro League players
UAE Pro League players
Expatriate footballers in Italy
Iranian expatriate footballers
Iranian expatriate sportspeople in Italy